Mastax fulvonotata is a species of beetle in the family Carabidae with restricted distribution in the India.

References

Mastax fulvonotata
Beetles described in 1952
Beetles of Asia